Palmilla is a Chilean city and commune in Colchagua Province, O'Higgins Region.

Demographics
Of these, 2,088 (18.6%) lived in urban areas and 9,112 (81.4%) in rural areas. The population grew by 3.1% (336 persons) between the 1992 and 2002 censuses.

The urban area of Palmilla forms a conurbation with the city of Santa Cruz, to the south, totaling 20,691 inhabitants.

Administration
As a commune, Palmilla is a third-level administrative division of Chile administered by a municipal council, headed by an alcalde who is directly elected every four years. The 2021-2024 alcaldesa is Gloria Paredes.

References

External links
 Municipality of Palmilla 

Communes of Chile
Populated places in Colchagua Province